Seigmenn may refer to:
 Seigmen – band 
 Laban Seigmenn – brand of sweets